The Jamaica International is an open international badminton tournament in Jamaica. This tournament established since 1950s, thus making this as one of the oldest badminton tournament in the Caribbean. The tournament has been an International Series level.

Previous Winners

Performances by nation

External links 
 Jamaica Badminton Association

References 

Badminton tournaments in Jamaica